SJX may refer to:

 SJX, the FAA LID code for Beaver Island Airport, Michigan, United States
 SJX, the IATA code for Sarteneja Airport, Belize